Liu Chen-san was a Chinese Nationalist General in the Second Sino-Japanese War.
 
In the beginning of the war in the battle of Battle of Beiping-Tianjin he commanded a brigade of the 38th Division, that beat back the Japanese in the Langfang area. From late 1937 to 1943 he was the general commanding the 180th Division in the Battle of Xuzhou and Western Hebei Operation.  In 1943 he was given command of 59th Corps which he held to the end of the war. He commanded 59th Corps during the Battle of Changde and the Battle of West Henan-North Hubei.

Sources
 Hsu Long-hsuen and Chang Ming-kai, History of The Sino-Japanese War (1937-1945) 2nd Ed., 1971. Translated by Wen Ha-hsiung, Chung Wu Publishing; 33, 140th Lane, Tung-hwa Street, Taipei, Taiwan Republic of China.

National Revolutionary Army generals
Chinese people of World War II
Possibly living people
Year of birth missing